Brian Wheeler, commonly known by the nickname "Wheels", is a radio announcer and host best known for his work as the play-by-play radio announcer for the Portland Trail Blazers of the National Basketball Association from 1998 to 2019.

Biography

Early years

Wheeler grew up in Southern California, where he was exposed at an early age to some of the most revered voices in sports broadcasting history, including Vin Scully of the Los Angeles Dodgers and Chick Hearn of the Los Angeles Lakers.

Wheeler attended Loyola University in Chicago, where he earned a degree in Broadcasting and Communications.

Early broadcast career

Brian Wheeler began his radio career as a broadcaster for his alma mater, Loyola University Chicago, where he called play-by-play for soccer, women's softball, and basketball for station WLUW-FM.

Wheeler went on to work in a series of broadcasting jobs in Chicago, including time working for Northwestern University, the Chicago White Sox, and SportsChannel. He worked for the NBA's Chicago Bulls during their first championship season.

Wheeler moved from Chicago to Seattle, Washington, to take a job working for the Seattle SuperSonics, remaining there for two seasons, also hosting a radio talk show on the team's flagship radio station, KJR.

Wheeler later worked as a broadcaster for the WNBA team the Sacramento Monarchs, also hosting pre-game and post-game shows for the Sacramento Kings of the National Basketball Association.

Career in Portland 

In 1998, Wheeler came to Portland, Oregon to take a job as radio play-by-play announcer for the NBA's Portland Trail Blazers. Wheeler was placed in the difficult position of replacing broadcaster Bill Schonely, the team's radio play-by-play announcer since its inaugural season in 1970–71—a situation which he later likened to entering a "hornets' nest". Wheeler was able to put distance between himself and Schonely by adhering to the promise made to his new employers to call games "like a fan would call them". The resulting mixture of shrill "homerism" and forthright honesty soon found its niche with fans.

Wheeler is best known for his frenetic style, loud and passionate delivery, and trademark calls such as "BOOM-SHAKA-LAKA!" following energetic Trail Blazer dunks and hard to sink shots. During his radio broadcasts he's also known to call out energy driven lines such as: "Yes sir!", "Ring it up!" and "Ooh, that was nasty!". Whenever former Blazer Nicholas Batum made a dunk, however, he replaced his "BOOM-SHAKA-LAKA!" call with "BATUM-SHAKA-LAKA!". After the final play of each Trail Blazer win, Wheeler concludes by saying, "And once again we can say: It's a great day to be a Blazer!"

Wheeler's radio partner in the role of analyst was former Trail Blazer player Antonio Harvey, up through the conclusion of the 2015 season. Wheeler became the sole radio broadcaster in 2016, with occasional appearances from former Blazer Brian Grant.

Wheeler hosted a daily radio talk show on KXTG-FM 95.5 The Game called Wheels at Work(originally "Wheels After Work").
In September 2010, Wheeler announced that he would step down from the Wheels at Work radio show to spend more time working on the Blazers broadcast side of his life.

During the 2018/19 season, Wheeler missed broadcasting the majority of the Trail Blazers games due to health issues. On July 12, 2019 the Trail Blazers president and CEO issued the following statement,

"Brian Wheeler has been an integral part of the broadcast team and Trail Blazers family since 1998 and his voice is synonymous with all the many great play-by-play calls over that 21-year span," said Trail Blazers president and CEO Chris McGowan. "We thank Brian for his contributions to the franchise and wish him all the best in his future endeavors."

Wheeler, issued the following response,

On September 9, 2019, the Portland Trail Blazers announced they hired Travis Demers to be the team's new radio voice.

In addition, he is a "Sports Broadcasting" course instructor for the online sports career training school Sports Management Worldwide in Portland.

Footnotes

External links
Brian Wheeler biography at Trail Blazers.com
 Peter Fornatale, "Extensive Interview with Portland Trail Blazers Radio Voice Brian Wheeler," Blazers Edge, April 15, 2013. www.blazersedge.com/

Year of birth missing (living people)
Living people
American sports announcers
Portland Trail Blazers announcers
Basketball announcers
Loyola University Chicago alumni
Radio personalities from Portland, Oregon
Sacramento Kings announcers
Chicago White Sox announcers
College football announcers
College basketball announcers in the United States
Seattle SuperSonics announcers